The Hartz Mountains are mountains with twin peaks located in southern Tasmania, Australia. The Hartz Mountains area experiences typical south-west weather conditions. In all seasons there can be snow, chilling rains, low temperatures, strong winds, upslope fog and sudden weather changes.

This walk (5 hours return) is only for fit and experienced walkers.

Climate

It is an extremely rainy climate with 252 such days per annum, though which seldom falls heavily but rather as light showers or drizzle. The mean afternoon relative humidity, is likewise extraordinary.

See also

 List of mountains of Tasmania

References

Mountains of Tasmania
Southern Tasmania